The London Docks were one of several sets of docks in the historic Port of London.

They were constructed in Wapping, downstream from the City of London between 1799 and 1815, at a cost exceeding £5½ million.

Traditionally ships had docked at wharves on the River Thames, but by the late 1700s more capacity was needed. They were the closest docks to the City of London until St Katharine Docks were built two decades later.

London Dock Company
The London Dock Company was formed in 1800, and work on the docks began in 1801. In 1864 they were amalgamated with St Katharine Docks.

Physical description 
The London Docks occupied a total area of about 30 acres (120,000 m2), consisting of Western and Eastern docks linked by the short Tobacco Dock. The Western Dock was connected to the Thames by Hermitage Basin to the south west and Wapping Basin to the south.

The Eastern Dock connected to the Thames via the Shadwell Basin to the east. The principal designers were the architects and engineers Daniel Asher Alexander and John Rennie.

The docks specialised in high-value luxury commodities such as ivory, spices, coffee and cocoa as well as wine and wool, for which elegant warehouses and wine cellars were constructed. The system was never connected to the railway network. The Port of London Authority took over the London Docks together with the rest of the enclosed docks in 1909.

After containerisation of commercial shipping 
The docks were closed to shipping in 1969 and sold to the borough of Tower Hamlets. The western portion of the London Docks was filled in with the (unrealised) intention of turning them into public housing estates. The land was still largely derelict when it was acquired in 1981 by the London Docklands Development Corporation (LDDC). It was subsequently redeveloped with over 1,000 individual properties centred on the old Tobacco Dock and Shadwell Basin.

The controversial "Fortress Wapping" printing works of Rupert Murdoch's News International corporation was constructed on the northern half of the infilled Western Dock. Hermitage Basin and Shadwell Basin survive. Wapping Basin is now a sports pitch and some of the Eastern Dock site is open space. A small canal runs across the southern part of the Western Dock site from Hermitage Basin to Tobacco Dock.

See also
Safeguarded wharf

References

Further reading

Buildings and structures in the London Borough of Tower Hamlets
Geography of the London Borough of Tower Hamlets
History of the London Borough of Tower Hamlets
 
Docks
Wapping